Drian Francisco (born November 10, 1982 in Sablayan, Occidental Mindoro, Philippines), nicknamed Gintong Kamao (Golden Fist), is a Filipino professional boxer. Born in the province of Mindoro, Francisco currently resides in Agoncillo, Batangas. His younger brother Lloyd Francisco, like him, is also a professional boxer.

Fighting style
Francisco is known for his powerful punches and aggressive style. His style was formerly compared to that of Luisito Espinosa.

Professional career
Francisco's father, Joe, was a former pro who is now a fireman. Early in his professional career, he was trained by former world flyweight titlist Erbito Salavarria.

He won the WBO Asia Pacific flyweight title by a 7th round TKO win over Pichitchok Singmanassak on December 30, 2006. On August 4, 2007, he defended it by stopping Wanmeechok Singwancha in one round.

After a year of inactivity, he was back in the ring on April 19, 2009 where he scored a TKO win over Sharil Fabanyo. This was held at the Araneta Coliseum and was undercard of the Nonito Donaire - Raul Martinez match.

Francisco won the WBA International super flyweight title on October 3, 2009 by stopping former WBA Flyweight Champion Roberto Vasquez in 10 rounds.

He fought Ricardo Nunez in a WBA super flyweight eliminator on April 17, 2010, at the Yñares Sports Arena in Pasig, Metro Manila, Philippines. A few days before the bout, Francisco said that a win  against Nunez was the key for a title shot. The Filipino boxer won the bout with an impressive knockout win at the 5th round. Francisco dominated the bout from the very start and was able to knock down Nunez twice in the opening round. Nunez survived the count and tried to defend himself and box his foe in the second and third round, connecting with some solid shot to stem Francisco's aggressive style. The boxer from Panama continued on this way in the next round but was once again put in trouble and eventually knocked down twice in the 5th, after being hammered with solid combinations. Referee Bruce McTavish stopped the bout after the second knockdown.

He fought Duangpetch Kokietgym on November 30, 2010 in Nong Khai, Thailand for the WBA interim superflyweight title. He won the bout with an impressive 10th round knockout.

It was a tough fight for Drian as Kokietgym repeatedly landed low blows. But in the end, Drian Francisco was able to overcome and knockout Kokietgym for the victory and WBA Interim Superflyweight Championship crown. The Thai fighter was down and out for only the second time in 54 fights.

Drian Francisco will most likely fight the winner of the Dec. 23 fight between WBA superflyweight champion Hugo Cazares and Japanese challenger Hiroyuki Hisataka. The winner of that fight will be mandated to stake the crown against Francisco on March 9. Cazares, 32, is traveling to Osaka to face Hisataka in his third title defense.

On 1 May 2011 Drian Francisco defensed his WBA interim World Super Flyweight title to Thai boxer Tepparith Singwancha  at Thailand. Francisco was knocked down in the third round. At the end Francisco lost WBA interim World Super Flyweight title for 
Thai boxer in Unanimous decision 113-114,113-114,111-117 

Drian admitted he was overconfident, he vowed to bounce back from the shock loss on points to Terrapith Singwancha and said he won’t make the same mistake again. Drian fought  against Michael Domingo which he won in a unanimous decision in Makati Coliseum on September 23, 2011. All three judges saw the fight in favor of the Sablayan, Mindoro Occidental native Francisco (21-1-1, 16 knockouts)—96-93, 95-94 and 96-93.

He is currently a boxing instructor at Evolve Mixed Martial Arts in Singapore.

References

External links

Official Website of Drian Francisco

1982 births
Super-flyweight boxers
Flyweight boxers
Living people
People from Occidental Mindoro
Southpaw boxers
Filipino male boxers
21st-century Filipino people